The Wisconsin Arts Board  (WAB) is a state agency based in Madison, Wisconsin. It is one of fifty-six state art agencies of the United States and works as a partner regionally with Arts Midwest and nationally with the National Endowment of the Arts. WAB's mission statement declares that it “is the state agency which nurtures creativity, cultivates expression, promotes the arts, supports the arts in education, stimulates community and economic development and serves as a resource for people of every cultural heritage.”

History 
The statutory agency known as the WAB was preceded by the privately funded Wisconsin Arts Foundation and Council (WAFC). Established in 1956, the WAFC organized conferences, published a quarterly arts calendar, and worked for state support of the arts. It changed its name to the Wisconsin Arts Council (WAC) in 1970 and in 1977 became the Wisconsin Foundation for the Arts.

In 1963, Governor John Reynolds created the Governor's Council of the Arts in order to promote the arts throughout the state. The Council did this particularly by establishing the Governor's Awards, but it did not receive state funding.  The WAFC and the Governor's Council worked as separate entities.

In 1965, the newly elected Governor Warren P. Knowles dissolved the Governor's Council of the Arts and designated the WAFC as “the official state coordinating group of the arts.”  Under its new designation the WAFC continued the Governor's Awards and received a study grant from the National Endowment of the Arts to investigate the formation of a state funded arts council. In 1967-1968, Governor Knowles introduced a bill to establish a state supported arts council, but the measure was tabled.

Under the urging of the WAC, Governor Patrick Lucey introduced a clause into the 1973-1975 budget bill to create and publicly fund a state arts council. On August 2, 1973, the Wisconsin Arts Board was established by the Wisconsin Legislature in Section 20. 15.53 of Wisconsin Assembly Bill 300.

In 2011, the independent bodied Arts Board was folded into the Department of Tourism, where it retained its independent, Governor-appointed board.

Legislative Powers and Duties 
According to Chapter 41 Subchapter IV of the 2011-12 Wisconsin Statutes and Annotations  WAB's powers and duties are as follows:

(a) Continually study the artistic and cultural activities within the state.
(b) Assist arts activities in the state.
(c) Assist communities in creating and developing their own arts programs.
(d) Encourage and assist freedom of artistic expression.
(e) Promulgate rules, pursuant to ch. 227, for the implementation and operations of this subchapter.
(f) Plan and implement, when funds are available in the appropriations under s. 20.380 (3) (b) and (o), a program of contracts with or grants-in-aid to groups or, in appropriate cases, individuals of exceptional talent engaged in or concerned with the arts. No grantee may receive any funds distributed as grants-in-aid under this paragraph unless the grantee provides at least 50% of the estimated total cost of the project, either in the form of moneys or in-kind contributions of equivalent value, to be funded under this paragraph.
(fm) Conduct a program identical to that described in par. (f), but only for American Indian individuals and groups. The program shall be funded from the appropriation under s. 20.380 (3) (km).
(g) Arrange and schedule the portrait of the governor or any former governor. Costs incurred under this paragraph shall be charged to the appropriation under s. 20.380 (3) (c) up to a limit of $10,000 per portrait. Costs in excess of $10,000 per portrait may be charged to the appropriation under s. 20.380 (3) (c) only with the prior approval of the joint committee on finance.
(h) Annually, award an amount equal to at least 5% of all state and federal funds received by the board in that year for grants to artists and arts organizations to artists who are minority group members and arts groups composed principally of minority group members. In this paragraph, "minority group member" has the meaning specified in s. 16.287 (1) (f).
(i) Administer challenge grant programs for the purpose of encouraging the fund-raising efforts of arts organizations.
(j) Annually pay to the Milwaukee Foundation, Inc., for deposit in the High Point fund, the amount appropriated under s. 20.380 (3) (e). 
The Arts Board may also:

(a) Enter into contracts with individuals, organizations, units of government and institutions for services furthering the development of the arts and humanities.
(am) Enter into contracts with American Indian individuals, organizations and institutions and American Indian tribal governments for services furthering the development of the arts and humanities.
(b) Accept all gifts and grants and expend them for the purposes intended.
(c) Award an operational grant to an organization if the sum of all operational grants awarded in the current year does not exceed 50% of the sum of all grants awarded to organizations from the appropriations under s.20.380 (3) (b) and (o) in the current year. In this paragraph, "operational grant" means a grant awarded by the board to support those administrative costs of an organization that are not directly related to the development of an artistic performance or product.

Governance 
The Arts Board is composed of an executive director and three staff members. It is governed by a fifteen-member board. Board members are Wisconsin citizens from all areas of the state and are appointed by the governor to serve a three-year term. The current chair of the board is Bruce Bernberg. The Arts Board meets at least four times a year and the meetings are open to the public.

Arts Board Members 
Bruce Bernberg, Chairperson, Racine 
Robert A. Wagner, Vice Chairperson, Milwaukee 
Kevin Miller, Secretary, Fond du Lac 
Ann Brunner, Kewaunee 
Susan Friebert, Milwaukee 
Mary Gielow, Mequon 
John Hendricks, Sparta 
Brian Kelsey, Fish Creek 
LaMoine MacLaughlin, Amery 
Ron Madich, La Pointe 
Heather A. McDonell, Madison 
Nick Meyer, Eau Claire 
Barbara E. Munson, Mosinee 
Sharon Stewart, Washburn 
Matthew Wallock, Madison

Executive Directors

Funding and Granting 
The Arts Board is funded by the state of Wisconsin and the National Endowment for the Arts. Through multiple granting programs to organizations and individuals, WAB provides grants that support community and economic development through creative expression and arts education and serve people of every culture and heritage in Wisconsin.  WAB's grant programs include Creation and Presentation organizational support grants, Creative Communities project grants, Folk Arts Apprenticeship grants, Arts Challenge Initiative grants, Woodland Indian Arts Initiative grants, and Regranting grants.

Twenty years ago, Wisconsin was typical among the 50 states, investing a healthy amount of money towards arts funding. Then in 2011, the Wisconsin Arts Board's budget was cut by 67 percent, sending Wisconsin (at the time) to 48th in state support for the arts. Since then, the situation has worsened. Wisconsin now ranks 50th in the nation in public funding on a per capita basis for the arts, according to the National Assembly of State Arts Agencies. Minnesota is first and Illinois second.

See also 
 Arts Council
 National Endowment for the Arts
 Arts Midwest

References

External links 
 Arts Midwest
 National Assembly of State Arts Agencies
 National Endowment for the Arts
 Wisconsin Arts Board
 Wisconsin Folks
 Wisconsin Teachers of Local Culture
 Wisconsin Tourism Board

Government of Wisconsin